Thézan-lès-Béziers (Thézan near Béziers; Languedocien: Tesan de Besièrs) is a commune in the Hérault department in the Occitanie region in southern France.

Population

See also
Communes of the Hérault department

References

Communes of Hérault